Federico Bonelli (born 1978 in Genoa) is an Italian ballet dancer and was a principal dancer with the Royal Ballet in London, England. He became the artistic director of Northern Ballet in May 2022.

Biography
Federico Bonelli was born in Genoa, Italy. He trained in classical ballet at the Turin Dance Academy before graduating into the Zurich Ballet, at the Zurich Opera House in Zürich, Switzerland. After three years in Zurich, Bonelli joined Dutch National Ballet based in Amsterdam, Netherlands. In September 2003, Bonelli became a principal dancer of the Royal Ballet.

In 2013 he danced Romeo in Romeo and Juliet.

In 2018 Bonelli was awarded a place on the Clore Leadership Program.

He danced in Frankenstein at The Royal Ballet in Spring 2019.

In December 2019 Bonelli performed the role of The Prince in The Royal Ballet's production of The Nutcracker. The performance was screened live to cinemas in the UK.

Bonelli became the artistic director of Northern Ballet on 1 May 2022.

Personal life
He is married to Royal Ballet former First Soloist Hikaru Kobayashi and they have a daughter.

References

Living people
Italian male ballet dancers
People from Genoa
Principal dancers of The Royal Ballet
1978 births